Cedar Dell, also known as Kennedy Memorial Home, is a historic plantation house located near Falling Creek, Lenoir County, North Carolina. It was originally constructed about 1820 as a two-story, three bay, Federal style brick dwelling with a side-hall plan.  It was enlarged to five bays wide and converted to a Victorian Gothic central hall plan mansion. The front facade features a one-story Eastlake-style porch with a low roof topped by a wrought iron balustrade and the rear facade has a two-tier porch.  Also on the front facade is a large bay window with a roof identical to that on the porch.  The house and property were deeded for use as an orphanage in 1912.

It was listed on the National Register of Historic Places in 1971. It is located in the Kennedy Memorial Home Historic District.

References

Houses on the National Register of Historic Places in North Carolina
Federal architecture in North Carolina
Gothic Revival architecture in North Carolina
Houses completed in 1820
Houses in Lenoir County, North Carolina
National Register of Historic Places in Lenoir County, North Carolina
Individually listed contributing properties to historic districts on the National Register in North Carolina